Vladislav Metodiev (Bulgarian: Владислав Методиев; born April 14, 1980 in Kyustendil) is a Bulgarian Greco-Roman wrestler who participated in the 2004 Summer Olympics and finished 12th overall. He also participated in the 2013 European Wrestling Championships.

References 

1980 births
Living people
Olympic wrestlers of Bulgaria
Wrestlers at the 2004 Summer Olympics
Wrestlers at the 2015 European Games
European Games competitors for Bulgaria
Bulgarian male sport wrestlers
People from Kyustendil
Sportspeople from Kyustendil Province
20th-century Bulgarian people
21st-century Bulgarian people